Arturo Robles Aguilar (born 15 December 1956) is a Mexican politician affiliated with the Institutional Revolutionary Party. And served for Municipal President of Pabellón de Arteaga to 1999–2001, As of 2014 he served as Deputy of the LIX Legislature of the Mexican Congress representing Aguascalientes.

References

1956 births
Living people
People from Pabellón de Arteaga Municipality
Institutional Revolutionary Party politicians
Members of the Chamber of Deputies (Mexico)
Politicians from Aguascalientes
Chapingo Autonomous University alumni
Municipal presidents in Aguascalientes
21st-century Mexican politicians